Cross-dressing as a literary motif is well attested in older literature but is becoming increasingly popular in modern literature as well. It is often associated with character nonconformity and sexuality rather than gender identity.

Analysis and function of the motif 
Female characters who cross-dress as men are also frequently portrayed as having done so to attain a higher social or economic position, a phenomenon known as the social progress narrative. Assuming a male identity allows them to travel safely, pursue jobs traditionally only available to men, and find heterosexual romance by breaking away from the all-female social world of the private sphere during the nineteenth and early twentieth centuries. These characters are generally described as heroic, courageous, and virtuous. Craft-Fairchild (1998) argues that the motif of female-to-male cross-dressing symbolizes women’s discontent with their relegation to the domestic sphere of society. However, the discovery of the characters’ assigned sex is often met with disapproval, indicating the endurance of traditional expectations of femininity.

Male-to-female cross-dressing is much less common in literature, and it is often used for comedic value or as a form of punishment for a male character. When it does appear, characters are often negatively feminized or portrayed as villains, in contrast to the heroism among female-to-male cross-dressers. The most well known example of this concept is the wolf from Little Red Riding Hood. Male-to-female cross-dressing is also almost always more closely linked to a character’s sexuality and that of their partners than in female-to-male cross-dressing.

The following is a partial list of literary works that address the motif of cross-dressing:

Ancient and medieval literature 
Achilles on Skyros (Achilleid, 1st century)
Roman de Silence (13th century)
Þrymskviða from the Poetic Edda - Thor dresses as a bride and Loki as the bridesmaid to retrieve Thor's hammer Mjölnir.

In the myth of the Trojan War, Achilles' mother Thetis wanted to keep him from joining the Greek forces (and thus dying in battle as was prophesied), so she dresses him in women's clothes and hides him among a cloister of women. When the Greek envoy arrives to fetch him for battle, Odysseus is suspicious of Achilles' absence and concocts a scheme to reveal the deception: he offers gifts to all the women, including among them a sword and shield. Then he has an alarm sounded, and when Achilles instinctively grabs the weapons to defend himself, the ruse is revealed and he must join the Greek army and fight at Troy.

In Ludovico Ariosto's Orlando Furioso, Bradamante, being a knight, wears full-plate armor; similarly, Britomart wears full-plate armor in Edmund Spenser's The Faerie Queene. Intentionally or not, this disguises them as men, and they are taken as such by other characters. In Orlando Furioso, Fiordespina falls in love with Bradamante; her brother Ricciardetto disguises himself as his sister, dressing as a woman, persuades Fiordespina that he is Bradamante, magically changed into a man to make their love possible, and in his female attire is able to conduct a love affair with her.

Early modern literature

Several of William Shakespeare's works include cross-dressing.

William Shakespeare made substantial use of cross-dressing for female characters who took on masculine clothing to carry out actions difficult for women. In The Merchant of Venice, Portia and her maid dress as men to plead in court on the merchant's behalf, and are quite successful in their ruse; in the same play, Shylock's daughter Jessica dresses as a man to elope with her Christian lover. Twelfth Night, or What You Will deals extensively with cross-dressing through the female protagonist Viola. She disguises herself as Cesario and immediately finds herself caught up in a love triangle: she loves Duke Orsino who loves Countess Olivia who loves Cesario. Luckily, all is resolved when Viola's presumed dead twin brother Sebastian comes along. We only see Viola as Viola in one scene; for the rest of the play she is dressed as Cesario. When Rosalind and Celia flee court in As You Like It, Rosalind dresses, for their protection, as a man. However, as a way to further complicate the situation for comedic effect, Shakespeare has Rosalind's male character "Ganymede" dress as a woman to help a male friend, Orlando de Boys, practice wooing Rosalind, with whom he is smitten, while at the same time fending off the affections Phoebe has for "Ganymede". In other words, it is a man, (the actor), dressing as a woman, dressing as a man, dressing as a woman.

The Merchant of Venice (c1657) a play by William Shakespeare in which Portia dresses as a man in order to defend Antonio against Shylock's suit for the 'pound of flesh' he is owed as forfeiture for failing to repay a debt in time.
Cymbeline (c1611) in which Cymbeline's daughter Imogen dresses as a page and calls herself "Fidele".
Belle-Belle ou Le Chevalier Fortuné (1698) - a fairy tale by Madame d'Aulnoy in which the female protagonist, Belle-Belle, disguises herself as a male knight to help the ruler of her kingdom defeat an emperor.
Edmund Spenser's "The Faerie Queene" includes a long section about Britomart, who dons male armor, falls in love with a woman, and has many adventures as a man.
Mademoiselle de Maupin by Theophile Gautier (1834) in which the eponymous heroine dresses as a man to discover what men are like when not in the company of women before she gets married.

In Arcadia, Sir Philip Sidney has one of the heroes, Pyrocles, disguise himself as an Amazon called Zelmane in order to approach his beloved Philoclea.

Lord Byron in his Don Juan, had Don Juan disguised as a woman in a harem.

Modern literature

In Giannina Braschi's mock diary, "Intimate Diary of Solitude/el diario intimo de la soledad" (the finale of the Latin American trilogy "Empire of Dreams/el imperio de los suenos") the heroine Mariquita Samper is a cross-dressing Macy's makeup artist who plots a literary revolution to kill the narrator.

Mark Twain's Huckleberry Finn disguises himself as a girl at one point in the novel, not very successfully.

In Anthony Powell's From a View to a Death, Major Fosdick's penchant for going to his room and donning a black sequin evening dress and a large picture-hat ultimately leads to his unraveling.

In Terry Pratchett's novel Monstrous Regiment, he has an entire regiment of females (of assorted species) dressing as males to join the army, satirizing the phenomenon of crossdressing during wartime.

In Tolkien's The Lord of the Rings, Éowyn disguises herself as man under the name Dernhelm to fight in the Battle of the Pelennor Fields outside the city Minas Tirith.

In Tamora Pierce's Song of the Lioness series, the main character, Alanna, disguises herself as a boy for eight years in order to become a knight.

As a theme
These Old Shades by Georgette Heyer (1926); historical novel. During the reign of Louis XV, a girl disguises herself as a boy.
The Masqueraders, by Georgette Heyer (1928); historical novel. Two siblings impersonate the opposite gender to escape persecution after the 1745 Jacobite Rising.
The Corinthian by Georgette Heyer (1940); historical novel. In which a young woman disguises herself as a boy in order to escape an unwanted marriage to her cousin. 
The Famous Five book series (1942) - Georgina wears boy's clothes, prefers to be called "George" and is pleased to be mistaken for a boy.
The Rose of Versailles (1972) - The female protagonist, Oscar François de Jarjayes, dresses as a man, but privately acknowledges her feminine side.
Johnny, My Friend (a translation of the Swedish novel Janne, min vän from 1985) - Johnny is a girl disguising as a boy.
Song of the Lioness - The main character, Alanna, disguises herself as a boy to become a knight.
Soldier's Secret - A fictional retelling of Deborah Sampson's life, who disguises herself as a soldier during the Revolutionary War.
Hana Kimi - A Japanese Manga, where the female protagonist, Ashiya Mizuki disguises herself as a boy to attend an all-boys school where her idol Sano Izumi attends.
Boy2Girl (2004) by Terence Blacker - Sam, the main character Matthew's male American cousin, is dared to go to school disguised as a girl as a challenge to prove himself to Matthew and his friends. However, the prank doesn't turn out the way it was planned.
The Outlaws of Sherwood (1988) by Robin McKinley - A young girl disguises herself as a boy and joins Robin Hood's band of outlaws.
Rowan Hood: Outlaw Girl of Sherwood Forest (2002) by Nancy Springer - A girl dresses as a boy to find her father, the famous outlaw Robin Hood.
Ouran High School Host Club series by Bisco Hatori - a female student masquerades as a boy to earn extra cash.
Princess Princess series by Mikiyo Tsuda - a young male student is invited to join an elite club at his new school whose members dress like girls.  
Monstrous Regiment (2003) by Terry Pratchett - After her brother vanishes, Polly Perks dresses up like a man to find him. 
Leviathan (2009) by Scott Westerfeld - Deryn Sharp, a young girl, dresses up like a man so she can join the British Air Service.
The Pearl that Broke Its Shell (2014), a novel by Nadia Hashimi - Rahima, an Afghani girl in 2007 needs to adopt the ancient custom of bacha posh that allows girls to dress and be treated as boys until they are of marriageable age in order to take care of herself and her sisters. A century earlier, her great-aunt, Shekiba, left orphaned by an epidemic, saved herself and built a new life the same way. 
Yentl the Yeshiva Boy (1983) by Isaac Bashevis Singer - A young Jewish girl in Poland dresses and lives as a man in order to study Talmudic Law.

As a minor plot element 
Jane Eyre (1847) - Mr Rochester cross-dresses as a Gypsy fortune-teller in order to fool Jane into confessing her love for him.
Adventures of Huckleberry Finn (1884) - Huckleberry dresses as a girl and calls himself Sarah Williams.
The Black Arrow: A Tale of the Two Roses (1888) by Robert Louis Stevenson - Joanna Sedley is disguised as a boy by Sir Daniel so he can marry her without interference.
A Scandal in Bohemia (1891), Irene Alder dresses as a man who wish Sherlock Holmes goodbye.
The Wind in the Willows (1908) by Kenneth Grahame - Toad escapes from prison dressed as a washerwoman.
Simon the Coldheart by Georgette Heyer (1925); historical novel. In which Lady Margaret disguises herself as a young man in order to escape captivity.
The Password to Larkspur Lane (1933), Ned Nickerson poses as a nurse.
The Talisman Ring by Georgette Heyer (1936); historical novel. in which the young male protagonist disguises himself as a maid in order to escape the Bow Street Runners.
Cigars of the Pharaoh (1934), Tintin dresses up as an old woman to escape Thomson and Thompson.
Frenchman's Creek (1941), Dona dresses as a man to be with Aubéry.
The Two Towers (of The Lord of the Rings) (1954) - Éowyn disguises as the man Dernhelm and travels with the Riders of Rohan to the Battle of the Pelennor Fields.
To the Hilt (1996), a crime novel by Dick Francis. The protagonist hires a young private detective who is skilled in disguise, mainly disguising himself as a woman.

See also 
Cross-dressing in film and television
Cross-dressing in music and opera

References

Further reading
http://www.brown.edu/Departments/Italian_Studies/dweb/themes_motifs/ingegno/disguise.php
https://www.goodreads.com/list/tag/crossdressing

 
Literature by topic
Cross-dressing culture